Pandit Kulchandra Gautam (Nepali: पं. कुलचन्द्र गौतम)(1934-2015 B.S.) was a Sanskrit scholar in the field of spirituality, language and philosophy. He has also worked in the field of Ayurveda. He was born in Nepal and hounured by the title of Bidwat Siromani. He has also been featured in the postage stamp of Nepal in 1992.

Life
Gautam was born on 27 June 1877 (15 Asar 1934 B.S.) as the youngest child of Pandit Ramakanta Gautam (father) and Savitridevi Gautam (mother) in Tamaguru Tole, Jiwanpur Village of Dhading district of Nepal (currently in province 3). His exact birthday is controversial because his Janmakudali was burnt during his cremation. His siblings are Bhadranidhi Gautam, Dandapadi Gautam, the name of his sister is not known.  The name Kulchandra was given to him while he was a student in Kashi. He died in 2015 B.S.

Publications
Gutam has published various books in Sanskrit and Nepali language on various topics.
 Manas Manjari
 Translated Amarakosha into Nepali 
 Sanskrit- Nepali dictionary 
 Radhawlankar
 Tulsikrit Ramayana
 Alankar Chanradaya
 Swayam Baidya (on Ayurbed )
 Purusartha Kalpaballi

References

Nepalese scholars
Nepali-language poets
Nepali-language writers
Sanskrit writers
20th-century Nepalese male writers